is a Japanese footballer currently playing as a defender for FC Gifu.

Career statistics

Club
.

Notes

References

1998 births
Living people
Japanese footballers
Association football defenders
Kansai University alumni
J3 League players
FC Gifu players